Sultan Gugu Sarikula (alternative spellings Salikula or Salikura, reigned 1585-1597) was the fifth sultan of Maguindanao in the Philippines. Sarikula was a direct descendant of Sharif Kabungsuwan, the first sultan of Maguindanao. He was the son of Sultan Bangkaya with his Matampay wife. Sarikula also had half brothers, Dimasangcay Adel and Buisan, who also reigned as sultans of Maguindanao before and after him.

Sarikula was involved in a power struggle with Buisan, which ended on him being ousted by his younger brother to Sulu in 1597.

Sarikula married Raja Putri, one of the daughters (or a sister) of Sultan Muwallil Wasit (Rajah Bongsu) from the Sulu Sultanate. Their daughter Putri Mampey married her first cousin, Sultan Kudarat, the son of Buisan.

See also 
 Sultanate of Maguindanao
 Kapitan Laut Buisan

References 

Filipino datus, rajas and sultans
Filipino Muslims
People of Spanish colonial Philippines
Filipino nobility
Filipino people of Malaysian descent